This is a list of Iranian Ambassadors to the United Kingdom.

1608,           Robert Shirley and Nakd Ali Beg
1809–1810,    Mirza Abolhassan Khan Ilchi
1810, Set Khan Astvatsatourian
1839–1939,    Mirza Hossein Khan Moghaddam (Great Britain refused to receive him and rejected his mission)
1850–1855,    Shafi' Khan (Chargé d'affaires)
1860–1861,    Mirza Jafar Khan Moshir od-Dowleh (ru)
1862–1865,    Mirza Mahmoud Khan Naser al-Molk (Minister Plenipotentiary) (ru)
1865–1867,    Mirza Mohammad-Ali Khan (acting)
1867–1872,    Mirza Mohsen Khan Moein ol-Molk (First as Chargé d'affaires then as Minister Resident and finally as Minister Plenipotentiary) (de)
1872–1889,    Mirza Malkam Khan Nazem od-Dowleh (Minister Plenipotentiary)
1889–1906,    Mohammad-Ali Khan Ala os-Saltaneh (Minister Plenipotentiary)
1907–1920,    Mehdi Khan Ala os-Saltaneh (First as Chargé d'affaires then as Minister Resident and finally as Minister Plenipotentiary)
1921–1926,    Davoud Khan Meftah os-Saltaneh (Minister Plenipotentiary) (fa)
1926–1927,    Abdolali Khan Sadigh os-Saltaneh (Minister Plenipotentiary) (de)
1927–1929,    Hovhannes Khan Masehian Moased os-Saltaneh (Minister Plenipotentiary)
1929–1930,    Hassan Taqizadeh (Minister Plenipotentiary)
1931–1932,    Ali-Qoli Masoud Ansari Moshaver ol-Mamalek (Minister Plenipotentiary) (ru)
1935–1937,    Hossein Ala' (CMG) (Minister Plenipotentiary)
1938–1938,    Ali Soheili (Minister Plenipotentiary)
1938–1940,    Fazlollah Nabil (acting)
1940–1941,    Mohammad-Ali Moghaddam (Minister Plenipotentiary) (fa)
1941–1947,    Hassan Taqizadeh (First as Minister Plenipotentiary then as Ambassador)
1947–1950,    Mohsen Rais 
1950–1951,    Ali Soheili
1951–1952,    Mohammad Hadjeb Davallou (Chargé d'affaires a.i.)
1954–1954,    Amir Khosrow Afshar (Chargé d'affaires a.i.)
1954–1958,    Ali Soheili
1958–1961,    Hossein Ghods-Nakhai 
1961–1962,    Mohsen Raïs
1962–1966,    Ardeshir Zahedi
1967–1969,    Abbas Aram
1969–1972,    Amir Khosrow Afshar
1972–1975,    Shuaauddin Ghotb
1976–1979,    Parviz C. Radji
1979,          Houshang Mahdavi (Abdolreza Mahdavi) (Chargé d'affaires) (fa)
1979–1980,    Gholam-Ali Afrouz (Chargé d'affaires) (fa) (Ambassador during the 1980 Iranian Embassy Siege)
1980–1981,    Seyfollah Ehdaei (Chargé d'affaires)
1981–1982,    Alireza Farrokhrouz (Chargé d'affaires)
1982–1986,    Jalal Sadatian (Chargé d'affaires) (fa)
1986–1989,    Mohammad-Mehdi Akhondzadeh (Chargé d'affaires) (de)
1989–1990,    Jamal Haj-Esmaili (Head of Iran's interest section in London)
1990–1992,    Shamseddin Khareghani (Chargé d'affaires)
1992–1998,    Gholamreza Ansari (Chargé d'affaires)(ru)
1998–1999,    Mahmoud Mohammadi
1999–2000,    Gholamreza Ansari
2000–2004,    Morteza Sarmadi
2004–2005,    Mohammad-Hossein Adeli
2006–2010,    Rasoul Movahedian
2010–2012,    Safar-Ali Eslamian Koupaei (Chargé d'affaires)
2013–2016, Mohammad-Hassan Habibollahzadeh (Chargé d'affaires)
2016–2021,    Hamid Baeidinejad 
2021,      Mehdi Hosseini Matin (Chargé d'affaires)
2021–2022, Mohsen Baharvand
2022–Present, Mehdi Hosseini Matin (Chargé d'affaires)

See also 
 List of diplomats of the United Kingdom to Iran

References 

United Kingdom
 
Iran